Nicholas Boshier is an Australian actor. Boshier gained fame after he was revealed to be the actor portraying YouTube celebrity Trent from Punchy, a character whom the film's director Anthony MacFarlane had previously lied about and insisted was genuine. Boshier went on to develop the cartoon Beached Az along with Macfarlane and Jarod Green, with Boshier voicing the main character of the whale. In 2014 he starred alongside Christiaan Van Vuuren in the series Soul Mates; Boshier and Van Vuuren had previously collaborated on the web series Bondi Hipsters.

Selected filmography
Television

Awards and nominations

ARIA Music Awards
The ARIA Music Awards are a set of annual ceremonies presented by Australian Recording Industry Association (ARIA), which recognise excellence, innovation, and achievement across all genres of the music of Australia. They commenced in 1987. 

! 
|-
| 2015 || "Fuhck the Bahnks" (by Bondi Hipsters) || ARIA Award for Best Comedy Release ||  || 
|-

References

External links 

 
 

Australian male film actors
Living people
21st-century Australian male actors
Australian male television actors
Australian YouTubers
Comedy YouTubers
Year of birth missing (living people)